Native laurel is a common name for several flowering plants and may refer to:

 Anopterus glandulosus, a shrub or small tree from Tasmania
 Cryptocarya glaucescens, a tree from eastern Australia